Sarsawa railway station is a railway station on Moradabad–Ambala line under the Ambala railway division of Northern Railway zone. This is situated at Sarsawa in Saharanpur district of the Indian state of Uttar Pradesh.

References

Railway stations in Saharanpur district
Ambala railway division